Raaga (THR Raaga) is a Malaysian Tamil-language radio station operated by Astro Radio. In 2015, as according to Nielsen RAM Survey Wave #1, THR Raaga maintained its position as Malaysia's leading Tamil-language station with over two million listeners. It also emerged as South East Asia's No.1 Tamil radio station by beating state-owned Minnal FM and Singapore-based Oli 96.8FM.

The station is well known for its breakfast show, Kalakkal Kaalai, which began broadcasting on 1 August 2006. The Hindi Power is also carried on the station since early 2010, which was previously broadcast on Gegar.

THR Raaga became a 24-hour radio station on all FM frequencies for the first time in July 2018, removing the entire Gegar broadcasts during 02:00 to 06:00. Previously, Raaga's broadcasts during these hours was only available via online and Channel 859 Astro.

History 
The radio station began broadcasting on 9 September 1994, after having started test transmission nine days before (31 August). It was known as TIME Highway Radio until 2005 and includes segments in Malay (Gegar), English and for a short period, in Mandarin (Mun Toh Tak), with Tamil-language segment (Raaga) being introduced later, as well as Hindi Power, a segment that focused mainly on Bollywood music. By March 2002, Tamil programs on THR accounted for 40 percent of THR's daily broadcasting time. AMP Radio Networks acquires the radio station in 2005 to relaunch a brand new radio channel to broadcast in Tamil.

From 2 January 2018, with the reformulation of radio stations owned by Astro, the "THR Raaga" name was simplified to Raaga, ending the usage of THR name. The change also happens to THR Gegar, which is now known as Gegar. As with other radio stations within Astro Radio group, the "FM" suffix is no longer used and a new logo was given to each of the radio stations.

Frequency 

(Via satellite TV)
 Astro (television): Channel 859

Note: Raaga can be received in Pahang via existing frequencies below:
 
- 99.3 MHz in Bentong, Karak, Raub, Lurah Bilut, Lanchang, Temerloh, Mentakab, Benta, Padang Tengku, Kuala Lipis, Sungai Ruan, Chenor, Maran, Jengka, Pekan, Gambang and part of Kuantan. (from Gunung Ulu Kali)
 
- 101.5 MHz in Bandar Bera (from Gunung Telapak Burok)
 
- 99.7 MHz in Kemayan, Teriang, Jerantut, Raub, Mengkarak, Kota Shahbandar, Bandar Muadzam Shah, and Bandar Tun Abdul Razak (Keratong) (from Gunung Ledang)
 
- 97.9 MHz in Cameron Highlands (from Gunung Kledang)

Web Streaming Restrictions 
Due to legal restrictions, the streaming of this station is only available in Malaysia and Brunei. Other Astro Radio stations are available internationally via their respective website.

Awards 
 Kancil Festival 2007 - Silver Award

Gallery

References

External links 
 

2005 establishments in Malaysia
Radio stations in Malaysia
Mass media in Kuala Lumpur
Radio stations established in 2005
Tamil-language radio stations
Tamil diaspora in Malaysia
Astro Malaysia Holdings
Tamil-language radio stations in Malaysia